
Gmina Władysławowo is an urban-rural gmina (administrative district) in Puck County, Pomeranian Voivodeship, in northern Poland. Its seat is the city of Władysławowo.

In years 1973-2014 gmina constituted an urban gmina. This changed on January 1, 2015, when it became an urban-rural gmina.

Villages
Apart from the town of Władysławowo, Gmina Władysławowo contains seven villages: Chałupy, Chłapowo, Jastrzębia Góra, Karwia, Ostrowo, Rozewie and Tupadły.

References

Wladyslawowo
Puck County